Vaillant is a surname. Notable people with the surname include:

Artists of the Dutch Golden Age
Andries Vaillant (1655–1693), engraver and painter
Bernard Vaillant (1632–1698), painter
Jacques Vaillant (1643–1691), painter
Jan Vaillant (1627–1668), painter
Wallerant Vaillant (1623–1667), painter

Politics
Auguste Vaillant (1861–1894), French anarchist
Cornelis Vaillant (1781–1849), Dutch judge and governor of Suriname
Daniel Vaillant (born 1949), French socialist politician
Édouard Vaillant (1840–1915), prominent French socialist

Science and medicine
François Le Vaillant (1753–1824), French explorer and ornithologist
George Clapp Vaillant (1901–1945), American anthropologist
George Eman Vaillant (born 1934), American psychiatrist
Léon Vaillant (1834–1914), French zoologist
Louis Vaillant (1876–1963), French doctor, naturalist, explorer and soldier
Sébastien Vaillant (1669–1722), French botanist

Other
André Vaillant (1890–1977), French linguist and Slavist
Auguste-Nicolas Vaillant (1793–1858), French naval officer
François Vaillant de Gueslis (1646–1718), French Jesuit missionary
George Clapp Vaillant (1901–1945), American anthropologist 
Greta Vaillant (1942–2000), French actress
Jean Alexandre Vaillant (1804–1886), French and Romanian historian and schoolteacher
Jean-Baptiste Philibert Vaillant (1790–1872), French soldier
Jehan Vaillant (fl. 1360–1390), French composer
Johann Vaillant (1851-1920) German coppersmith, founder of the Vaillant Group
John Vaillant (born 1962), American writer and journalist
Marguerite Vaillant (1855–1930), French opera singer
Nigel Le Vaillant (born 1958), British actor
Pierre Henri Vaillant (1878–1939), French painter
Raymond Vaillant (1935–2006), French composer

Fictional characters:
Michel Vaillant, a comic book character